Semiray Ahmedova (born 21 April 1981 in Sofia, Bulgaria) is a Luxembourgian architect and politician of The Greens. She became a deputy in 2019.

Biography
Born in 1981 in the Bulgarian capital Sofia, she became a citizen of Luxembourg in 2004. At the age of 9, she fled the communist regime of the People's Republic of Bulgaria with her parents. She attended school in Dudelange and later studied architecture and urban planning in Brussels. She went back to Luxembourg and worked in an architectural firm, later as an advisor for sustainable building at myenergy agency, before she joined the Ministry of Spatial Planning. She describes herself as a "girl of Dudelange" ( in Luxembourgish).

Ahmedova joined The Greens party in 2017. She failed to win a seat in the Dudelang municipal council in the 2017 communal elections. She stood in the 2018 general election in the South constituency but failed to win a seat, since she was in ninth position on The Greens' list and the party won three seats only. However, she later replaced resigning deputy  and became the youngest deputy of Luxembourg on October 8th, 2019.

Ahmedova's political work focuses on energy and environmental policy, as well as on fighting the rising housing prices in Luxembourg.

References

External links
Semiray Ahmedova, Chamber of Deputies of Luxembourg 

Luxembourgian women architects
21st-century Luxembourgian women politicians
21st-century Luxembourgian politicians
The Greens (Luxembourg) politicians
Members of the Chamber of Deputies (Luxembourg) from Sud
Bulgarian emigrants to Luxembourg
1981 births
People from Dudelange
Living people